Akosita Havili Lavulavu (born 1985) is a Tongan politician and former Cabinet Minister. In 2021 she was jailed for fraud.

Lavulavu is the wife of former MP Etuate Lavulavu. She was educated at Tonga High School, with tertiary study at Brigham Young University–Hawaii, earning a Bachelor in Information System, and the University of the South Pacific, earning an MBA.

Before entering politics, she was the director of the Unuaki o Tonga Royal Institute. Following her husband's conviction for bribery in 2016 she stood in the resulting by-election and was elected to the Legislative Assembly of Tonga, becoming the 5th female MP in Tonga's history. She was re-elected at the 2017 general election, after which she was appointed Minister of Internal Affairs and Sports.

On 3 March 2018, Lavulavu and her husband were both arrested on fraud charges stemming from their management of the Unuaki o Tonga Royal Institute in 2016. She was subsequently sacked from her Ministerial position.

Following the death of Akilisi Pōhiva Lavulavu supported Pohiva Tuionetoa for Prime Minister, leaving the DPFI to join Tuionetoa's new People's Party. While still awaiting trial, in October 2019 she was appointed Minister for Infrastructure and Tourism in the cabinet of Pohiva Tuionetoa. On 4 June 2021 she and her husband were convicted of 3 counts of obtaining money by false pretenses. On 17 June, she took leave from her ministerial position until the case was resolved. On 2 July 2021, she and her husband were sentenced to six years in prison by the Supreme Court of Tonga. On 11 October 2022 the convictions were quashed by the Court of Appeal, and the case sent back to the Supreme Court for retrial.

References

Members of the Legislative Assembly of Tonga
Tongan women in politics
Women government ministers of Tonga
Living people
People from Vavaʻu
Brigham Young University–Hawaii alumni
Tongan Latter Day Saints
University of the South Pacific alumni
21st-century women politicians
1985 births
20th-century Tongan women
21st-century Tongan women
Female interior ministers
Prisoners and detainees of Tonga
Tongan prisoners and detainees
Tongan politicians convicted of crimes